The 1996–97 NCAA Division II men's ice hockey season began in October 1996 and concluded on March 15 of the following year. This was the 25th season of second-tier college ice hockey.

Regular season

Standings

Note: the records of teams who were members of Division III conferences during the season can be found here.

1997 NCAA Tournament

Note: * denotes overtime period(s)Note: Mini-games in italics

See also
 1996–97 NCAA Division I men's ice hockey season
 1996–97 NCAA Division III men's ice hockey season

References

External links

 
NCAA